is a Japanese football player who plays for AC Nagano Parceiro in J3 League.

Club statistics
Updated to January 1st, 2022.

References

External links
Profile at Nagano Parceiro

1987 births
Living people
Hannan University alumni
Association football people from Miyagi Prefecture
Japanese footballers
J2 League players
J3 League players
Ehime FC players
V-Varen Nagasaki players
AC Nagano Parceiro players
Association football midfielders